This is a list of the National Register of Historic Places listings in Pottawattamie County, Iowa.

This is intended to be a complete list of the properties and districts on the National Register of Historic Places in Pottawattamie County, Iowa, United States. Latitude and longitude coordinates are provided for many National Register properties and districts; these locations may be seen together in a map.

There are 40 properties and districts listed on the National Register in the county, including one National Historic Landmark. Three other sites were once listed on the Register but have been removed.

|}

Former listings

|}

See also

 List of National Historic Landmarks in Iowa
 National Register of Historic Places listings in Iowa
 Listings in neighboring counties: Cass, Douglas (NE), Harrison, Mills, Montgomery, Sarpy (NE), Shelby, Washington (NE)

References

 
Pottawattamie
Buildings and structures in Pottawattamie County, Iowa